Chicago VIII is the seventh studio album, and eighth album overall, by American rock band Chicago, released in 1975.  Following the experimental jazz/pop stylings of Chicago VII, the band returned to a more streamlined rock-based sound on this follow-up.

Background
After five consecutive years of constant activity, the members of Chicago were feeling drained as they came to record Chicago VIII at producer James William Guercio's Caribou Ranch in Colorado in the summer of 1974.  While the variety in styles explored on Chicago VIII were reminiscent of Chicago VI, this particular album had a more distinct rock feel, as exemplified on Peter Cetera's "Anyway You Want" (later covered by Canadian singer Charity Brown) and "Hideaway", as well as Terry Kath's Hendrix tribute "Oh, Thank You Great Spirit" and James Pankow's hit "Old Days" (#5). The ballad "Brand New Love Affair, Part I & II" charted at #61.

Preceded by Lamm's "Harry Truman" (#13) as lead single, Chicago VIII was held over for release until March 1975 as Chicago VII was still riding high in the charts.  While it easily reached #1 in the US, the album had a lukewarm critical reception — still commonly considered, by some, as one of their weakest albums from the original lineup, resulting in the briefest chart stay of any Chicago album thus far.  It was also the first album to feature session percussionist Laudir de Oliveira as a full-fledged band member rather than merely a sideman, the first addition to the original lineup.

Inside the original LP package was an iron-on t-shirt decal of the album cover and a poster of the band in a station wagon being pulled over by a policeman.

This album was mixed and released in both stereo and quadraphonic. In 2002, Chicago VIII was remastered and reissued by Rhino Records with two unreleased songs: "Sixth Sense" (an instrumental, or possibly a backing track) by Kath and "Bright Eyes" by Lamm, as well as a version of "Satin Doll" recorded for a Dick Clark's "Rockin' New Year's Eve" special - all as bonus tracks.

Track listing

Personnel 
Chicago
 Peter Cetera – bass, lead and backing vocals
 Terry Kath – electric and acoustic guitars, lead and backing vocals
 Robert Lamm – keyboards, lead and  backing vocals
 Lee Loughnane – trumpet, backing vocals
 James Pankow – trombone, brass arrangements
 Walter Parazaider – saxophones, flute, clarinet
 Danny Seraphine – drums
 Laudir de Oliveira – percussion

Additional personnel
 Caribou Kitchenettes – vocal chorus on "Harry Truman" (John Carsello, Donna Conroy, Laudir de Oliveira, Bob Eberhardt, Steve Fagin, Kristy Ferguson, Linda Greene, Lee Loughnane, Brandy Maitland, Katherine Ogden, James Pankow, Walter Parazaider, Joanne Rocconi, Richard Torres and Angele Warner)
 String orchestrations on "Brand New Love Affair", "Oh, Thank You Great Spirit", "Long Time No See" and "Old Days" – Patrick Williams

Production 
 James William Guercio – producer
 Wayne Tarnowski – engineer
 Jeff Guercio – engineer
 Mark Guercio – engineer
 Phil Ramone – mixing
 John Berg – cover design
 Nick Fasciano – cover design
 Anthony Maggiore – artwork and handwriting
 Reid Miles – poster photography

Charts

Singles - Billboard (United States)

References

Chicago (band) albums
1975 albums
Albums produced by James William Guercio
Columbia Records albums
Albums arranged by Patrick Williams (composer)
Albums with cover art by Reid Miles